Newton Abbot Racecourse is a thoroughbred horse racing venue located on the north bank of the River Teign in the parishes of Kingsteignton and Teigngrace just north of Newton Abbot, Devon, England. The course is a tight, flat left-handed oval of about 1 mile 1 furlong. There are seven relatively easy fences to a circuit and a very short run in to the finish.

History

The course was first established in 1866 when the  site was purchased. The main grandstand was built in 1969 and opened by the Queen Mother, while the corporate facilities were opened in 1990.

Corporate hospitality
The racecourse has a variety of corporate meeting, conference rooms, suites and private boxes as well as cafeterias, bars and two restaurants: 'The Winning Post' and 'The Paddock'. Many of the rooms have views across the racecourse, whilst there is parking in and around the venue for 5,000 cars.

Other events at the racecourse
The racecourse holds monthly car boot sales and regular antiques fairs. Ladies Day is held in June and there are a series of evening races.

Greyhound racing
A greyhound racing track was constructed on the final turn inside the racecourse in 1974 following the closure of the Halfway Greyhound Track in Kingskerswell. The opening night was 2 May 1974 and races featured regularly until 2005. The track featured a grandstand that could be dismantled when horse racing took place, it was all-sand circuit and had an 'Inside Sumner' hare system.

The greyhound racing was independent (not affiliated to the sports governing body the National Greyhound Racing Club) and was known as a flapping track which was the nickname given to independent tracks. The track circumference was 437 yards and the race distances were 325, 482, 525 and 762 yards with the main events being the Newton Abbot Derby and Newton Abbot St Leger. Facilities included five on-course bookmakers and a forecast only primitive ticket machine totalisator.

Notable races
 Lord Mildmay Memorial Handicap Chase

References

External links
Newton Abbot Racecourse (Official website)
Course guide on GG.COM
Course guide on At The Races

Horse racing venues in England
Buildings and structures in Devon
Sports venues in Devon
Newton Abbot
Sports venues completed in 1866
1866 establishments in England
Defunct greyhound racing venues in the United Kingdom
Kingsteignton